The National Highway 40 or the N-40 is one of Pakistan National Highway running from Lakpass near Quetta to the border town of Taftan via Naukundi in Baluchistan, Pakistan extending into Iran via Road 84. It is a two lane highways with total length of 610 km. It is  maintained and operated by Pakistan's National Highway Authority.

See also 
 Motorways of Pakistan
 Transport in Pakistan

References

External links
 Quetta - Taftan Highway Info
 National Highway Authority

Roads in Pakistan
Roads in Balochistan, Pakistan